Sariola may refer to:

Sariola, a place in Finnish mythology
Aale Sariola, (1882-1948), Finnish clergyman and politician